This article is a list of the hat tricks scored by or conceded by the United States men's national soccer team. Besides the instances of a player scoring three goals in a game, the list also includes games where a player has scored more than three goals.

Landon Donovan is the all-time leader for the United States national team with three hat tricks. The only other players with multiple hat tricks in international play are Jozy Altidore and Clint Dempsey, each with two hat tricks apiece.

Hat-tricks scored by the United States 
Score lists United States first.

Hat-tricks conceded by the United States 
Score lists United States first.

References

Hat-tricks
United States hat-tricks
United States hat-tricks